Connely-Holeman House is a historic home located at Pleasantville, Venango County, Pennsylvania.  It was built between 1869 and 1871, and is a large three-story, square wood-frame building in the Second Empire style.  It measures 50 feet by 50 feet and features two projecting bays, covered porches with Corinthian order columns, and a mansard roof with cast iron cresting.  A rear addition was built in 1887.

It was listed on the National Register of Historic Places in 2007.

References

Houses on the National Register of Historic Places in Pennsylvania
Second Empire architecture in Pennsylvania
Houses completed in 1871
Houses in Venango County, Pennsylvania
National Register of Historic Places in Venango County, Pennsylvania